Proverbs 31 is the 31st and final chapter of the Book of Proverbs in the Hebrew Bible or the Old Testament of the Christian Bible. Verses 1 to 9 present the advice which King Lemuel's mother gave to him, about how a just king should reign. The remaining verses detail the attributes of a good wife or an ideal woman (verses  10–31). The latter section is also known as Eshet Ḥayil.

Text
The original text was written in the Hebrew language. This chapter is divided into 31 verses.

Some early manuscripts containing the text of this chapter in Hebrew are of the Masoretic Text, which includes the Aleppo Codex (10th century), and Codex Leningradensis (1008).

There is also a translation into Koine Greek known as the Septuagint, made in the last few centuries BC. Extant ancient manuscripts of the Septuagint version include Codex Vaticanus (B; B; 4th century), Codex Sinaiticus (S; BHK: S; 4th century), and Codex Alexandrinus (A; A; 5th century).

The words of Lemuel (31:1–9)

In this part, an unnamed queen-mother gives instruction to her son, King Lemuel, on his duty to administer justice. Using the appeal to his filial respect to a mother and his birth as an answer of a prayer (verse 2, cf. ), the mother warns the king against sexual promiscuity and drunkenness (verses 3–7). The eighth and ninth verses are an appeal against inequality and injustice.

The good wife (31:10–31)

Verses 10–31 of this chapter, also called Eshet Ḥayil (אשת חיל, woman of valor), form a poem in praise of the good wife, a definition of a perfect wife or "ideal woman" in the nation of Israel, who is 'an industrious housewife, a shrewd businesswoman, an enterprising trader, a generous benefactor (verse 20) and a wise teacher (verse 26). This "Woman of Valor" has been described as the personification of wisdom, or in some sense as a description of a particular class of women in Israel, Persia, or in Hellenistic society. Some see this as a praise directed from the husband to his wife.

It is one of the thirteen alphabetical acrostic poems in the Bible, where each line begins with a successive letter in the Hebrew alphabet. The word חיל (Ḥayil) appears in verses 10 and 29 of the passage, thought as the summary of the good woman's character. Traditionally it has been translated as "virtuous" or "noble". Some scholars have suggested that it rather means "forceful", "mighty", or "valiant", because this word is almost exclusively used in the Tanakh with reference to warfare.  

Aberdeen theologian Kenneth Aitken notes that in view of the warnings against women portrayed as dangerous or adulterous in chapters 1 to 9, it is "fitting" that the book ends by "directing the attention of prospective bridegrooms to the ideal wife".

Verse 30 
Charm is deceitful and beauty is passing,
But a woman who fears the Lord, she shall be praised.
The key to the woman's industry, acumen, kindness and wisdom lies in her "fear of the ".

Uses
This chapter is recited on Friday night before Shabbat dinner in some Jewish homes. 

The chapter has been emphasized within the biblical womanhood movement, and a number of books have been published on the "Proverbs 31 woman". This emphasis has been subject to criticism in Christian articles.

References

Sources

External links
 Text of Proverbs 31
 Text of Eshet Hayil (JPS 1917 - Public Domain)

31
Solomon
Women in the Hebrew Bible